"Hide and Seek" is a science fiction short story  by English writer Arthur C. Clarke, first published in 1949 in the magazine Astounding Science Fiction.  It was subsequently published as part of a short story collection in Expedition to Earth in 1953.

Summary
"Hide-and-Seek" uses the story within a story format.

The frame story is told in the first person, set in a future that has interplanetary travel and has recently seen an interplanetary war. The characters are out hunting when one, Kingman, attempts to shoot a squirrel which takes refuge behind the trunk of a tree. This reminds Kingman of an incident which happened to him during the recent war.

Kingman then recounts the story (in the third person) of agent K-15 who was fleeing in a space craft with vital information, pursued by the  space cruiser Doradus. K-15 was 12 hours from a rendezvous with a capital ship, but the cruiser was only 6 hours behind him.

To escape K-15 lands on the moon Phobos, sending his craft on broadcasting a message of his plan. He is left alone on the hostile moon to face the oncoming cruiser. However, despite the apparently overwhelming superiority the cruiser had over a man in a spacesuit armed only with a  pistol, the story shows the advantage.
The cruiser could only manoeuvre with difficulty so close to Phobos, while K-15 could easily outpace it on the ground. Also, despite the cruiser’s firepower, K-15’s gun gave him the advantage over any men (who would be unarmed) that  the cruiser might land. 
At first K-15 tries to keep to the opposite side of the moon, in case the cruiser opens fire on the surface, but later realizes he is better keeping it in sight, just above his horizon. This continues until the arrival of K-15's rendezvous, and the cruiser is forced to flee, where Kingman’s story ends.

Back in the frame story the narrator asks Kingman if he was, in fact, K-15. No, he replies, he wasn’t, and leaves for another shot at the squirrel. It transpires Kingman was commander of Doradus.

External links

See also

The central feature of the narrative, that of a single armed man pitted against a cruiser, and succeeding, is also seen in CS Forester's book, Brown on Resolution.

Short stories by Arthur C. Clarke
1949 short stories
Works originally published in Analog Science Fiction and Fact
Fiction set on Phobos (moon)